The 1979 Western Illinois Leathernecks football team represented Western Illinois University as a member of the Association of Mid-Continent Universities during the 1979 NCAA Division II football season. They were led by first-year head coach Pete Rodriguez and played their home games at Hanson Field.

Schedule

References 

Western Illinois
Western Illinois Leathernecks football seasons
Western Illinois Leathernecks football